The 2006 Polish local elections were held in two parts. with its first round on November 12 and the second on November 26, 2006. In the election's first round, voters chose 39,944 gmina councillors, 6,284 powiat councillors and 561 deputies to provincial voivodeship sejmiks. Additionally, 2,460 city and town mayors, borough leaders and other officials were decided by direct or runoff elections in the second round. The elections were seen as a test to the government of Prime Minister Jarosław Kaczyński, whose coalition between his own Law and Justice party and its junior coalition partners, the Self-Defense of the Republic of Poland and the League of Polish Families, had undergone a severe crisis two months prior.

Background 
Following the appointment of Jarosław Kaczyński as Prime Minister following the resignation of Kazimierz Marcinkiewicz, the coalition between Kaczyński's own rightist Law and Justice, the agrarian Self-Defence of the Republic of Poland and the Christian right League of Polish Families parties experienced deep conflict. In September 2006, Self-Defense's leader Andrzej Lepper increasingly sparred with Kaczyński over the national budget, criticizing the prime minister's stance on rural infrastructure spending and sending extra troops to assist the War in Afghanistan. Kaczyński responded by asking for Lepper's dismissal from the government. In light of the political crisis, Kaczyński sought a new coalition partner in order to avoid early elections. One month later in October, Kaczyński and Lepper reconciled, returning Self-Defense to the coalition government and reappointing Lepper as both his deputy and as Minister for Agriculture. However, the coalition crisis dented the government's popularity in opinion polls.

In the midst of the crisis, Kaczyński aide Adam Lipinski was secretly filmed trying to coax Self-Defense Sejm MP Renata Beger to rejoin the coalition government with financial and legal assistance. Beger later handed the film to television networks. The opposition Civic Platform party seized on the scandal, organizing street demonstrations in Warsaw to demand early elections.  The government countered the protests by drawing its supporters for demonstrations of its own, claiming the film demonstrated normal political bargaining.

Results 
In the aftermath of the local elections' first round on November 12, Kaczyński's Law and Justice saw intermediate gains across voivodeship sejmiks and moderate results of powiat and gmina councillor seats. Law and Justice held provincial voivodeship sejmiks in Łódź, Podkarpacie, Małopolska, Lublin, and Podlasie. In major municipalities, the party significantly lost its majority of councillor seats in Warsaw to Civic Platform, as well as suffered setbacks in Łódź, Poznań and Kraków. The party's candidate for the Warsaw mayoralty, former Prime Minister Kazimierz Marcinkiewicz, finished next to the strong showing of Civic Platform candidate Hanna Gronkiewicz-Waltz. However, in the second round of polls held two weeks later on November 26, Gronkiewicz-Waltz defeated Marcinkiewicz. The defeat in Warsaw served as a blow to Kaczyński, whose brother Lech previously served as Warsaw's mayor until his election to the presidency in 2005.

The government's major opposition  party, Civic Platform, emerged as the winner during the election, increasing its share of representation across seats in voivodeship, county and municipal administrations. In the election results, Civic Platform gained majorities in 10 voivodeships (Warmia-Masuria, Pomerania, West Pomerania, Lubuskie, Lower Silesia, Opole, Silesia, Wielkopolska, Kujawy-Pomerania, and Masovia).

The elections demonstrated a clear defeat for the Left and Democrats, the upstart coalition between the Democratic Left Alliance, Social Democracy of Poland, the Labour Union and the Democratic Party. Still suffering from the fallout of the Rywin affair and Orlengate, the Democratic Left Alliance and its leftist coalition partners lost all majorities in previously held voivodeship sejmiks and a vote decline in local races. However, the party elected candidates Jacek Majchrowski as Mayor of Krakow and Tadeusz Ferenc as Mayor of Rzeszów, though Majchrowski later suspended his party membership to become an independent.

The Polish People's Party fared well during the elections. Managing to increase its share of nearly 14 percent of all powiat councillor seats and 10 percent for all gmina seats, the party was the most elected partisan organization to receive seats in municipal councils.

Law and Justice's coalition partner, the League of Polish Families, suffered during the local elections. The government's coalition party mustered two percent of the vote in the voivodeship sejmiks, a little more than one percent in county councils, and nearly half a percentage point in gmina councils.

Independent politicians or local political activists enjoyed strong results in municipal councils and in city mayoralties.

Turnout

Voivodship councils

County councils

Municipal councils

Mayors

Post election controversies
Following the election, controversy erupted regarding a 2005 law, obliging the mayors of municipalities to publicly disclose their own, as well as their spouse's, financial circumstances. The law required the successful candidate's disclosure statement to be provided within 30 days after their inauguration, whereas the statement regarding the candidate's spouse was to be submitted within 30 days after the actual election. Due to the law, several elected officials resigned, while others refused. The highest profile figure affected newly elected Warsaw mayor of Hanna Gronkiewicz-Waltz, refused to offer her resignation. Waltz submitted her and her husband's statements on January 2, 2007, exactly 30 days after her inauguration. On January 20, the newspaper Dziennik reported that Waltz's documents proceeded past the deadline by two days. Based on this, Prime Minister Jarosław Kaczyński maintained that Gronkiewicz-Waltz's mandate had expired on December 28, 2006, calling for new municipal elections within her jurisdiction. Gronkiewicz-Waltz and Civic Platform argued that the prime minister does not carry authority to make a decision in this matter, and that the case instead be examined by a court. Legal experts maintained that by submitting their statements on the same day, Gronkiewicz-Waltz observed the spirit, if not the letter of the law. Also, having two different deadlines for the statements could be considered as an unconstitutional legal trap. In the meantime, the opposition Civic Platform party announced that it would renominate Gronkiewicz-Waltz should the elections be repeated. On March 13, 2007, the Constitutional Tribunal of Poland ruled against the government, striking down the law. However, those officials who previously resigned were not allowed to return to their posts.

References

External links 
National Electoral Commission - official results
2006 Polish local election - wp.pl

2006
2006 elections in Poland
History of Poland (1989–present)
November 2006 events in Europe